MUAC may refer to:
 Maastricht Upper Area Control Centre, European air traffic control centre
 Museo Universitario Arte Contemporáneo, Mexico City
Mid-upper arm circumference, an anthropometric measurement